Plano is a city in Appanoose County, Iowa, United States. The population was 59 at the time of the 2020 census.

History
Plano was incorporated in 1916. A large portion of the early settlers being natives of Plano, Illinois, caused the name to be selected.

Geography
Plano is located at  (40.756189, -93.046327).

Demographics

2010 census
As of the census of 2010, there were 70 people, 30 households, and 18 families living in the city. The racial makeup of the city was 90.0% White, 8.6% African American, and 1.4% from two or more races. Hispanic or Latino of any race were 8.6% of the population.

There were 30 households, of which 23.3% had children under the age of 18 living with them, 46.7% were married couples living together, 6.7% had a female householder with no husband present, 6.7% had a male householder with no wife present, and 40.0% were non-families. 36.7% of all households were made up of individuals, and 26.7% had someone living alone who was 65 years of age or older. The average household size was 2.33 and the average family size was 2.89.

The median age in the city was 39.5 years. 27.1% of residents were under the age of 18; 3% were between the ages of 18 and 24; 21.4% were from 25 to 44; 20% were from 45 to 64; and 28.6% were 65 years of age or older. The gender makeup of the city was 52.9% male and 47.1% female.

2000 census
As of the census of 2000, there were 58 people, 29 households, and 20 families living in the city. The racial makeup of the city was 94.83% White, and 5.17% from two or more races. Hispanic or Latino of any race were 1.72% of the population.

There were 29 households, out of which 17.2% had children under the age of 18 living with them, 51.7% were married couples living together, 6.9% had a female householder with no husband present, and 31.0% were non-families. 31.0% of all households were made up of individuals, and 10.3% had someone living alone who was 65 years of age or older. The average household size was 2.00 and the average family size was 2.40.

In the city, the population was spread out, with 12.1% under the age of 18, 5.2% from 18 to 24, 15.5% from 25 to 44, 48.3% from 45 to 64, and 19.0% who were 65 years of age or older. The median age was 54 years. For every 100 females, there were 100.0 males. For every 100 females age 18 and over, there were 112.5 males.

The median income for a household in the city was $30,625, and the median income for a family was $33,125. Males had a median income of $28,750 versus $27,000 for females. The per capita income for the city was $22,474. There were 20.0% of families and 23.1% of the population living below the poverty line, including no under eighteens and 13.3% of those over 64.

References

Cities in Appanoose County, Iowa
Cities in Iowa
1916 establishments in Iowa